Connie Francis sings Irish Favorites is a studio album recorded by U. S. Entertainer Connie Francis.

Background
After the success of her 1959 album Connie Francis sings Italian Favorites (which remained on the album charts for 81 weeks and peaked at # 4), Francis decided to release more albums that appealed to immigrants in the United States. In 1960, she had released one album each of Spanish and Latin American Favorites, Jewish Favorites, and More Italian Favorites, followed by Folk Favorites in 1961.

Connie Francis sings Irish Favorites was the sixth installment in this series of "Favorites", which would produce two more albums featuring German Favorites and Great Country Favorites, both in 1964, the latter being a duet album with Hank Williams, jr.

The album was recorded during two sessions on January 25 and 26, 1962 at St. Patrick's Cathedral in New York City under the musical direction of Don Costa and Joe Mele.

Track listing

Side A

Side B

Unreleased songs from the sessions

References

Connie Francis albums
1962 albums
MGM Records albums
Covers albums
Albums produced by Danny Davis (country musician)